Fade to Black is a 2008 album by Tommy Cash. The album includes duets with George Jones, on "Some Kind of a Woman", and Marty Stuart, on "Six White Horses", a new version of Cash's 1970 hit, as well as several Johnny Cash songs in tribute to his late brother.

Track listing
 "Some Kind of a Woman" (Tommy Cash; Jimmy Peppers) - 2:48
 duet with George Jones
 "I Walk the Line" (Johnny Cash) - 2:20
 duet with his son Mark Cash
 "Fade to Black" (Tommy Cash, Nathan Whitt) - 3:45
 "Six White Horses" (Larry Murray) - 2:46
 duet with Marty Stuart
 "Folsom Prison Blues" (Johnny Cash) - 2:26
 "Ring of Fire" (June Carter, Merle Kilgore) - 2:44
 "Ramblin' Kind" (Tommy Cash) - 2:29
 "Ballad of a Teenage Queen" (Jack H. Clement) - 2:22
 "Ragged Old Flag" (Johnny Cash) - 3:30
 "Ghost Riders" (Stan Jones) - 3:44
 "Get Rhythm" (Johnny Cash) - 2:25
 "Rise and Shine" (Carl Perkins) - 2:27
 "San Quentin" (Johnny Cash) - 2:22
 "Skip a Rope" (Jack Moran/Glenn Tubb) - 2:38
 "On the Wings of a Dove" (Bob Ferguson) - 2:51
 duet with his sister Joanne Cash Yates

2008 albums
Tommy Cash albums
Johnny Cash tribute albums